Psilopygida is a genus of moths in the family Saturniidae erected by Charles Duncan Michener in 1949.

Species
Psilopygida crispula (Dognin, 1905)

References

Ceratocampinae